Deh Firuzvand-e Bala (also Romanized as Deh Fīrūzvand-e Bālā; also known as Deh Fīrūzvand-e ‘Olyā, Deh Forūzvand-e ‘Olyā, and Denū-ye Deh Fīrūzvand) is a village in Nurali Rural District, in the Central District of Delfan County, Lorestan Province, Iran. At the 2006 census, its population was 108, in 29 families.

References 

Towns and villages in Delfan County